Angus Fraser (born 1965) is an English cricketer.

Angus Fraser may also refer to:

Angus Fraser (civil servant) (1928–2001), British civil servant
Angus Fraser (television producer), Canadian film and television writer
Angus Fraser (rugby union) (born 1999), Scottish rugby union player